Denis "Toots" Kelleher (1931-2002) was an Irish former Gaelic footballer who played as a centre-back for the Cork senior team.

Kelleher made his debut for the team during the 1950 championship and was a regular member of the starting fifteen until his retirement following the completion of the 1958 championship. During that time he won two National League medals and two Munster medals but failed to capture an All-Ireland medal.

Kelleher also had a lengthy club career with Millstreet.

References

1931 births
2002 deaths
Millstreet Gaelic footballers
Cork inter-county Gaelic footballers
Munster inter-provincial Gaelic footballers